Prosh may refer to:

Prosh (University of Western Australia)
Prosh (University of Adelaide)
University of Melbourne Prosh Week
Prosh (Marvel Comics) - a fictional character published by Marvel Comics